Tout Puissant Union Sportive Centrafricaine de Bangui is an association football club from Central African Republic based in Bangui.

The team plays in the Central African Republic League.

Stadium
Currently the team plays at the 35000 capacity Barthelemy Boganda Stadium.

Honours
Central African Republic League: 1980, 1992

References

External links

Football clubs in the Central African Republic
Bangui